SYSTAT is a command on the DEC TOPS-10 and RSTS/E computer operating systems by which one obtained the current general status of the running operating system. The commands showed the logged-on users, processes, I/O, and other interesting system management information.

References

Digital Equipment Corporation